The Charles E. Conrad Mansion is a historical Victorian era shingle-style Norman mansion located in Kalispell, Montana.  It was designed by the noted Spokane, Washington, architect Kirtland Cutter.  It was the home of Charles E. Conrad, a late 19th century shipping magnate and early pioneer of Kalispell.

Style and construction
The style of the architecture is a revivalist version of the vernacular farmhouse style of the architecture of Normandy in France, rather than the version of Romanesque architecture called "Norman architecture".  Construction of the home began in 1892 and it was completed in November 1895.

National Register of Historic Places
The mansion is listed on the National Register of Historic Places listings in Flathead County, Montana.

See also
C. E. Conrad Memorial Cemetery, also listed on the National Register

References

External links

National Register of Historic Places in Flathead County, Montana
Houses on the National Register of Historic Places in Montana
Shingle Style architecture in Montana
Kalispell, Montana
Houses in Flathead County, Montana
Historic house museums in Montana
Neo-Norman architecture in the United States
Houses completed in 1895
1895 establishments in Montana